Lee Royston Ingram (born 10 January 1965) is a former English cricketer.  Ingram was a right-handed batsman who bowled left-arm fast-medium.  He was born at Cambridge, Cambridgeshire.

Ingram played a single Minor Counties Championship fixture for Cambridgeshire against Staffordshire in 1984.

In 1999 he made his List-A debut for Huntingdonshire against Bedfordshire in the 1st round of the 1999 NatWest Trophy.  He played 2 further List-A matches for the county, firstly in the 1st round of the 2000 NatWest Trophy against a Hampshire Cricket Board side and lastly in the 2nd round of the same competition against a Yorkshire Cricket Board side.  In his 3 List-A matches, he scored 18 runs at a batting average of 9.00 and a high score of 13.  With the ball he took 3 wickets at a bowling average of 33.00, with best figures of 1/26.

References

External links
Lee Ingram at Cricinfo
Lee Ingram at CricketArchive

1965 births
Living people
Sportspeople from Cambridge
English cricketers
Cambridgeshire cricketers
Huntingdonshire cricketers